The 1986 Great Taste Coffee Makers season was the 12th season of the franchise in the Philippine Basketball Association (PBA).

Transactions

Trade

Finals stint
After failing to win the Grandslam last year, the Great Taste Coffee Makers return to the finals against the Tanduay Rhum Makers in the first conference of the season. Great Taste had the returning Jeff Collins, a former best import awardee who led the CFC ballclub to a title back in 1984, and Michael David Holton (the third import to arrived as Collins' partner after Mike Wilson and Gregory Jones) as their imports going up against the Tanduay pair of Rob Williams and Andre McKoy. The Coffee Makers were the odds-on favorite to win the title due to their championship experience but the Rhum Makers were determined to end a long-drought and gave their franchise its first PBA title. Great Taste lost to Tanduay in six games in the Best-of-seven title series.

Occurrences
Great Taste’ first choice for an import in the Open Conference, Anthony Frederick, arrived and was measured slightly over six-foot-six, the limit for one of the two imports. Sources said at least two teams refused to grant the exception, leaving the Coffee Makers with no choice but to send him back home. Frederick only saw action as a guest import for amateur club RFM-Swift’s that beat Alaska Milk in the PBA-PABL exhibition series at the Rizal Coliseum a week before the start of the Third Conference.

The Coffee Makers paraded two new imports namely Lewis Jackson and Alvin Franklin at the start of the second round of eliminations in the Open Conference, replacing the pair of Johnny Brown and Eric Turner.

Roster

Imports

References

Great Taste Coffee Makers seasons
Great